Josep Maria Vallès i Casadevall (born July 1940 in Barcelona) is a Spanish academic and politician.

Career
Vallès studied law (UB), Political Science (IEP, in Paris) and Business Management (ESADE, Barcelona). He is Emeritus Professor in Political Science and Administration in the Universitat Autònoma de Barcelona, where he was Dean of the Faculty of Political Sciences and Sociology (1985–1990) and Rector (Vice-Chancellor) (1990–1994). Vallès has been President of the Spanish Association of Political Science and Administration (AECPA) and member of the Executive Board of the European Consortium for Political Research (ECPR). His research interests have been electoral systems and behaviour, local government and public policy. Vallès was elected to the Parliament of Catalonia in 1999 and re-elected in 2003, as Barcelona candidate for Ciutadans pel Canvi (CpC), a civic association. In 2003, he was appointed Minister of Justice in the Catalan Government presided by Pasqual Maragall. Vallès is married and has two sons (Oriol and Màrius).

References

1940 births
ESADE alumni
Justice ministers of Catalonia
Living people
Members of the Parliament of Catalonia
Politicians from Barcelona
Socialists' Party of Catalonia politicians
University of Barcelona alumni